Nagayama's spots are enanthem of red papules on the soft palate.
It is seen in roseola also known as roseola infantum, a viral disease caused by HHV6 and HHV7.

See also 
 Oral florid papillomatosis
 List of cutaneous conditions
 Roseola infantum

References 

Conditions of the mucous membranes